Jazz Africa is a live album by keyboardist Herbie Hancock and Gambian kora player Foday Musa Suso. The recording took place in Los Angeles, California's Wiltern Theatre as part of the 1986 concert series Jazzvisions.  The performance was also released on videotape and laserdisc with additional concert performances.

Track listing
 "Kumbasora" – 6:15
 "Debo" – 17:06
 "Cigarette Lighter" – 13:05
 "Jimbasing" – 7:51
All compositions by Foday Musa Soso
Recorded live at the Wiltern Theatre, LA in December 1986

Personnel
Herbie Hancock - keyboards
Foday Musa Suso - kora, vocals
Aïyb Dieng - percussion
Armando Peraza - percussion
Adam Rudolph - percussion
Joe Thomas - bass
Hamid Drake - drums, percussion
Abdul Hakeem - guitar

References

Polydor Records albums
Herbie Hancock live albums
1987 live albums
Live electro albums
Foday Musa Suso albums
Albums recorded at the Wiltern Theatre